Kushtia Zilla School is an educational institution situated at Kushtia Sadar Upazila, Kushtia, Bangladesh. The school was established in 1961. It is located just beside the Jhenaidah-Kushtia road. The academic activities of this school start from third grade to tenth grade. The EIIN number of this school is 117743.

Dress code 
Students of this institution have to wear a white shirt which has its monogram on it, and students wear sweaters during the winter season. They wear white shoes.

In Liberation War 
Pakistani Military had opened a camp in Kushtia Zilla School during the liberation war, 1971. They set up a torture cell there. The battle of Kushtia which was highlighted in Times magazine was organized in the field of Kushtia Zilla School. Kushtia Zilla School is the part of the glory.

Activities 
The school has BNCC, Scouts and Debating Club. The debating club started its journey on June 5, 2005.
Kushtia Zilla School has won National School Level Handball Championship for three times. Kushtia Zilla School Debating club regular organizes various events & has been recognized as one of the most organized debating clubs in Bangladesh.

Academic results 

It is one of the famous schools in Kushtia District. It listed at the top in every public examination. Recent Secondary School Certificate (SSC) results are given below.

Celebrating 50 years 
The old students of Kushtia Zilla School arranged a reunion 2011 for celebrating its Golden jubilee. Around 3,000 students participated in this reunion.

Notable alumni 
 Abul Barkat, renowned economist and professor, University of Dhaka, Economics Department
 S.I. Tutul, a Bangladeshi singer
 Anamul Haque, a Bangladeshi cricketer was a student in junior level

See also 
 Islamic University, Kushtia

References

External links 
 Kushua Zilla School Website

High schools in Bangladesh
Educational institutions established in 1961
1961 establishments in India
Boys' schools in Bangladesh
Organisations based in Kushtia District